Rzym may refer to:

 Rzym, Kuyavian-Pomeranian Voivodeship, Poland
 Rzym, Kartuzy County, Poland

See also 

 Rome, Italy (Rzym in Polish)